Mason Alexander Park (born July 12, 1995) is an American actor. They gained prominence through their stage work, earning a Helen Hayes Award. On television, they are known for their roles in the Netflix adaptations of the anime Cowboy Bebop (2021) and Neil Gaiman's The Sandman (2022), and the Quantum Leap (2022) revival on NBC.

Early life 
Park was born in Fairfax, Virginia, and moved around as a child for their father's work before settling down in North Carolina. They are non-binary. They are of Spanish and Mexican descent. Park discovered acting through a summer camp in Texas. In need of a new environment after being bullied at school, Park went to Los Angeles with their mother and enrolled at Grand Arts High School. They graduated in 2016 with a Bachelor of Arts in Musical Theatre from Point Park University in Pittsburgh.

Filmography

Film

Television

Web

Stage

Audio

Awards and nominations

References

External links 

Living people
1995 births
Actors from North Carolina
Actors from Virginia
American film actors
American musical theatre actors
American non-binary actors
American television actors
LGBT people from North Carolina
LGBT people from Virginia
Point Park University alumni
21st-century American actors